WIBH (1440 AM) is a radio station licensed to Anna, Illinois, United States.  The station airs a Classic Country format, and is currently owned by WIBH, Inc.

References

External links
WIBH's website

IBH
Classic country radio stations in the United States